Michelle Mueller (born 20 November 1963) is a Canadian Equestrian Team athlete in Eventing. At the 2012 Summer Olympics she competed in the Individual eventing.

References

Canadian female equestrians
1963 births
Living people
Olympic equestrians of Canada
Equestrians at the 2012 Summer Olympics